Le comiche is a 1990 Italian comedy film  written and directed by Neri Parenti and starring Renato Pozzetto  and  Paolo Villaggio. It had two sequels, Le comiche 2 (1991) and Le nuove comiche (1994).

Plot
Neri Parenti creates some comic episodes, inserting various gags taken from films of the past: Laurel and Hardy, Charlie Chaplin and Buster Keaton. In the silent black and white prologue two railroad workers, Paolo and Renato, are trying to outrun a steam train and jump out of the screen into a movie theatre; in the first episode they are bungling painters who ruin a wedding; in the second the two friends destroy a gas station; in the third episode they are forced to work in the mountain chalet, ruining the holiday for all customers; in the last the two friends are the perfect double of two fierce mafia, who plan to use the "twins" for a suicide mission; in the epilogue Paolo and Renato are chased by characters of all the episodes back into the silent film.

Cast   
Renato Pozzetto as  Renato
Paolo Villaggio as  Paolo
Fabio Traversa as  Mario 
 Alessandra Casella  as  Domitilla 
Gian as  Amilcare 
Tiziana Pini as Amilcare's wife
Enzo Cannavale as the priest
Sal Borgese as the gas station attendant
  Renato D'Amore as  the innkeeper
 Giovanni Cianfriglia as  the trucker 
  Ennio Antonelli as  the pizza chef
 Andrea Belfiore as  the stripper at the nightclub
  Pierfrancesco Villaggio as  the bodyguard 
 Franca Scagnetti as a guest at the wedding

See also
List of Italian films of 1990

References

External links

1990 comedy films
1990 films
Films directed by Neri Parenti
Films scored by Bruno Zambrini
Italian comedy films
1990s Italian-language films
1990s Italian films